This is a list of Middle Tennessee Blue Raiders football players in the NFL Draft.

Key

Selections

References

Middle Tennessee

Middle Tennessee Blue Raiders NFL Draft